In the United States Armed Forces, a brigadier general is a one-star general officer in the United States Army, Marine Corps, Air Force, and Space Force.

A brigadier general ranks above a colonel and below a major general.  The pay grade of brigadier general is O-7. 
It is equivalent to the rank of rear admiral (lower half) in the other United States uniformed services which use naval ranks.  It is abbreviated as BG in the Army, BGen in the Marine Corps, and Brig Gen in the Air Force and Space Force.

History

The rank of brigadier general has existed in the U.S. military since the inception of the Continental Army in June 1775. To prevent mistakes in recognizing officers, a general order was issued on July 14, 1775, establishing that brigadier generals would wear a ribbon, worn across the breast, between coat and waistcoat, pink in color. Later, on June 18, 1780, it was prescribed that brigadier generals would instead wear a single silver star on each epaulette. At first, brigadier generals were infantry officers who commanded a brigade; however, over the course of the 19th and 20th centuries, the responsibilities of the rank expanded significantly.

During the period from March 16, 1802, to January 11, 1812, the rank of major general was abolished and brigadier general became the highest rank in the U.S. Army. Foreseeing the need for an expanded general staff in case of war, which seemed imminent, Congress restored the rank of major general in January 1812.

The first brigadier general in the U.S. Marine Corps was Commandant Archibald Henderson, brevetted to the rank of brigadier general in the 1830s for his service in the Second Seminole War. The first non-brevet brigadier general in the Marines was Commandant Jacob Zeilin who was promoted to the rank in 1874, but when he retired in 1876, colonel once again became the highest rank in the Marines until March 1899 when Commandant Charles Heywood was promoted. Ever since then, the office of Commandant has been held by a general officer, with the permanent rank of the commandant raised to major general in 1908, and then to lieutenant general and subsequently to general during World War II, which rank it has held ever since.

The insignia for a brigadier general is one silver star worn on the shoulder or collar, and has not changed since the creation of the rank two centuries ago. Since the Mexican–American War, however, the lower rank of colonel has been the normal rank appointed to command a brigade that is organic to a division (e.g., the 1st Brigade of the 94th Infantry Division, vice the 187th Infantry Brigade). While separate brigades (e.g. the 187th, commanded by then-BG William Westmoreland in Korea) were traditionally commanded by brigadier generals, this practice has ceased in recent history.

Today, an Army or Marine Corps "BG" or "BGen," respectively, typically serves as deputy commander to the commanding general of a division or division-sized units and assists in overseeing the planning and coordination of a mission. A Marine Expeditionary Brigade (MEB), as the medium capability (and sized) scalable Marine Air Ground Task Force (MAGTF) with up to 20,000 Marines, is normally commanded by a Marine BGen. An Air Force brigadier general typically commands a large wing or serves as the deputy commander for a NAF. Additionally, one-star officers of all services may serve as high-level staff officers in large military organizations.

Statutory limits
U.S. law explicitly limits the total number of general officers who may be on active duty. The total number of active duty general officers is capped at 231 for the Army, 62 for the Marine Corps, and 198 for the Air Force. The President or Secretary of Defense may increase the number of slots for one branch, so long as they subtract an equal number from another. Some of these slots are reserved by statute.

Promotion, appointment and tour length
For promotion to the permanent grade of brigadier general, eligible officers are screened by a promotion board consisting of general officers from their branch of service. This promotion board then generates a list of officers it recommends for promotion to general rank. This list is then sent to the service secretary and the Joint Chiefs for review before it can be sent to the President, through the Secretary of Defense, for consideration. The President nominates officers to be promoted from this list with the advice of the Secretary of Defense, the service secretary, and if applicable, the service's chief of staff or commandant. The President may nominate any eligible officer who is not on the recommended list if it serves in the interest of the nation, but this is uncommon. The Senate must then confirm the nominee before the officer can be promoted. Once the nominee is confirmed, they are promoted to that rank once they assume or hold an office that requires or allows an officer of that rank. For positions of office reserved by statute, the President nominates an officer for appointment to fill that position. For all three uniformed services, because the grade of brigadier general is a permanent rank, the nominee may still be screened by an in-service promotion board. The rank does not expire when the officer vacates a one-star position. Tour length varies depending on the position, by statute, or when the officer receives a new assignment. The average tour length of a one-star billet is two to four years.

Retirement
Other than voluntary retirement, statute sets a number of mandates for retirement. All brigadier generals must retire after five years in grade or 30 years of service, whichever is later, unless selected or appointed for promotion, or reappointed to grade to serve longer. Otherwise, all general and flag officers must retire the month after their 64th birthday. However, the Secretary of Defense can defer a general or flag officer's retirement until the officer's 66th birthday and the President can defer it until the officer's 68th birthday. Because there are a finite number of General officer positions, one officer must retire before another can be promoted. As a result, General and flag officers typically retire well in advance of the statutory age and service limits, so as not to impede the upward career mobility of their juniors.

See also
Rear admiral
Commodore admiral
List of brigadier generals in the United States Regular Army before February 2, 1901
List of United States military leaders by rank
United States Army officer rank insignia
United States Marine Corps officer rank insignia
United States Air Force officer rank insignia

References

 United States
Military ranks of the United States Army
Military ranks of the United States Marine Corps
Officer ranks of the United States Air Force
Officer ranks of the United States Space Force
One-star officers